The 1947–48 Scottish Cup was the 63rd staging of Scotland's most prestigious football knockout competition. The Cup was won by Rangers who defeated Greenock Morton in the replayed final.

First round

Replays

Second round

Third round

Quarter-finals

Semi-finals

Final

Teams

Final (replay)

Teams

See also
1947–48 in Scottish football
1947–48 Scottish League Cup

Played between the same teams:
1922 Scottish Cup Final
1963 Scottish League Cup Final

References

Scottish Cup seasons
1947–48 in Scottish football
Scot